Nao Hibino and Emily Webley-Smith are the defending champions, Hibino chose not to defend her title. Webley-Smith partnered Riko Sawayanagi, but lost in the quarterfinals.

Hiroko Kuwata and Zhu Lin won the title, defeating Sophie Chang and Alexandra Mueller in the final, 6–0, 7–5.

Seeds

Draw

References 
 Draw

Kentucky Bank Tennis Championships - Doubles